Mangelia pseudoattenuata is a species of sea snail, a marine gastropod mollusk in the family Mangeliidae.

Description
The length of the shell attains 5 mm.

Distribution
This species occurs in the Atlantic Ocean off Senegal.

References

External links

pseudoattenuata
Gastropods described in 2004